The 2013 ICF World Junior and U23 Canoe Slalom Championships took place in Liptovský Mikuláš, Slovakia from 17 to 21 July 2013 under the auspices of the International Canoe Federation (ICF) at the Ondrej Cibak Whitewater Slalom Course. It was the 15th edition of the competition for Juniors (U18) and the 2nd edition for the Under 23 category.

No medals were awarded for the men's U23 C2 event due to the fact that it did not meet the criteria for a medal event. In an Olympic event there need to be at least 6 countries from 3 continents represented to count as a world championship event.

Medal summary

Men

Canoe

Junior

U23

Kayak

Junior

U23

Women

Canoe

Junior

U23

Kayak

Junior

U23

Medal table

References

External links
International Canoe Federation

ICF World Junior and U23 Canoe Slalom Championships
ICF World Junior and U23 Canoe Slalom Championships